Jordan Marshall (born 27 October 1996) is an English footballer who plays as a left-back for Dundee and has previously played for Queen of the South.

Career
Marshall was born in Newcastle upon Tyne and is a product of the Carlisle United Academy.

Queen of the South 
On 29 June 2015, Marshall signed for Queen of the South after being involved with them in the latter part of the previous season. His signing was announced alongside that of Dale Hilson and Kyle Jacobs. Marshall first played for Queens on 25 July 2015 in the first round of the Scottish League Challenge Cup, playing the full 90 minutes of a 2–0 win over Stranraer at Palmerston Park and receiving a yellow card in the tenth minute. He made his league debut on 8 August 2015 as Queens started the Scottish Championship season with a 3–1 home win over Alloa Athletic, again playing the entirety of the match. On 25 February 2017, he signed a one-year extension to his contract until May 2018.

On 17 March 2018, Marshall scored his first goal for Queen of the South in a 3–1 defeat versus St Mirren at Palmerston. He initially decided to leave the club at the end of the 2017-18 season, turning down the offer of a new contract, but he failed to find a new club during the 2018 close season and decided to sign a new one-year contract with Queens on 25 June 2018.

Dundee 
On 18 June 2019, Marshall signed a two-year contract with Dundee. He impressed throughout his first season, until it was ended early due to severe thigh strain. On 7 January 2021, he signed a two-year contract extension with Dundee, keeping him with the club until 2023. Marshall would return from injuries in time to be a part of the Dundee team which won the Premiership play-offs and gained promotion to the Scottish Premiership.

Marshall would make his 100th appearance for the Dark Blues on 17 September 2022 against Inverness Caledonian Thistle. After suffering a knee injury in October, Marshall remained out of action until December when he started in an away win against Ayr United which put Dundee atop the Scottish Championship at Christmas.

Career statistics

References

External links

Living people
1996 births
Footballers from Newcastle upon Tyne
English footballers
Association football defenders
Queen of the South F.C. players
Dundee F.C. players
Scottish Professional Football League players